Christopher McEvoy,  (2 February 1899 – 12 October 1953) was a British aviator and flying ace, credited with nine aerial victories during the First World War.

Early life
Christopher McEvoy was born in Cricklewood, North London on 2 February 1899. He was the first-born son of The Reverend Cuthbert McEvoy and his wife Margaret.

First World War
When old enough, McEvoy joined the Royal Flying Corps. In January 1918, he was assigned to No. 66 Squadron in Italy as a pilot. He was slightly wounded the following month, and hospitalized for a short while. On 30 March 1918, he scored his first aerial victory; by 1 August, he had run his tally of victories to nine. Illness then removed him from the cockpit; he was medically evacuated back to England with dysentery. After recovery, he served in No. 37(Home Defence) Squadron. He was awarded Distinguished Flying Cross, gazetted on 23 September 1918:

List of aerial victories

Second World War and beyond
McEvoy returned to service in the Second World War, being appointed a temporary pilot officer on probation on 1 September 1939. He served in the rank of flight lieutenant as a codes officer for RAF Coastal Command. It seems likely he got in some cockpit time, as he was still serving as a pilot officer when he surrendered his commission because of illness on 7 September 1940.

Christopher McEvoy died at Dorking, England on 12 October 1953 following a prolonged illness.

References

1899 births
1953 deaths
British World War I flying aces
Recipients of the Distinguished Flying Cross (United Kingdom)
Royal Air Force officers
Royal Flying Corps officers